The 2016 Argentina Open was a men's tennis tournament played on outdoor clay courts. It was the 19th edition of the ATP Buenos Aires event, and part of the ATP World Tour 250 series of the 2016 ATP World Tour. It took place in Buenos Aires, Argentina, from February 8 through 14, 2016.

Points and prize money

Point distribution

Prize money

Singles main draw entrants

Seeds 

 Rankings are as of February 1, 2016.

Other entrants 
The following players received wildcards into the main draw:
 Fabio Fognini
 Rafael Nadal
 Renzo Olivo

The following players received entry from the qualifying draw:
 Facundo Bagnis
 Marco Cecchinato
 Gastão Elias
 Albert Montañés

The following player received entry as a lucky loser:
 Facundo Argüello

Withdrawals 
Before the tournament
 Aljaž Bedene →replaced by  Nicolás Almagro
 Andreas Haider-Maurer →replaced by  Guido Pella
 Jack Sock →replaced by   Daniel Muñoz de la Nava
 Fernando Verdasco (late withdrawal) →replaced by  Facundo Argüello

Doubles main draw entrants

Seeds 

1 Rankings are as of February 1, 2016.

Other entrants 
The following pairs received wildcards into the main draw:
 Facundo Argüello /  Facundo Bagnis
 Tomás Lipovsek Puches /  Manuel Peña López

Finals

Singles 

  Dominic Thiem defeated  Nicolás Almagro 7–6(7–2) , 3–6, 7–6(7–4)

Doubles 

  Juan Sebastián Cabal /  Robert Farah defeated  Iñigo Cervantes /  Paolo Lorenzi 6–3, 6–0

External links 
 

Argentina Open
ATP Buenos Aires
Argentina Open
Argentina Open